Mitchell van der Gaag (born 22 October 1971) is a Dutch professional football coach and former player who played as a centre-back, currently the assistant manager of Manchester United.

He made 208 Eredivisie appearances and scored 19 goals, for NEC, Sparta Rotterdam, PSV and Utrecht. Abroad, he had spells at Motherwell in the Scottish Premier League and Marítimo in Portugal's Primeira Liga, playing 174 total games for the latter and scoring 19 times.

As a manager, van der Gaag led several teams including Marítimo and Belenenses in Portugal, as well as Excelsior and NAC in his country.

Playing career
Van der Gaag was born in Zutphen, Gelderland. After graduating from PSV Eindhoven's youth academy, he spent three seasons on loan to NEC Nijmegen and Sparta Rotterdam, returning to Eindhoven for a further three years but never being an important first-team figure, however.

In January 1995, van der Gaag signed with Motherwell. He scored a career-best seven goals in 28 games in his second full season to help the Steelmen narrowly avoid relegation from the Scottish Premier Division, and subsequently returned to the Eredivisie with FC Utrecht.

For the 2001–02 campaign, van der Gaag joined Portugal's C.S. Marítimo, going on to be one of the Madeira club's most influential players as it consolidated in the Primeira Liga. He netted six times in 2003–04, helping the team finish sixth and qualify for the UEFA Cup.

Coaching career
Van der Gaag retired from football in 2007, having spent one season with Al-Nassr FC in Saudi Arabia. In July of the following year, he returned to Marítimo as a coach and took the reins of its B team.

In October 2009, after Carlos Carvalhal's dismissal following a string of bad results, van der Gaag was promoted to the main squad. After helping them finish fifth – a place conquered in the last round with a 2–1 away win against Vitória de Guimarães, who were leapfrogged in the process – and qualify for the Europa League, his contract was renewed for a further year.

On 14 September 2010, after collecting only one point in the league's first four matches and being ousted by FC BATE Borisov in the Europa League, van der Gaag was sacked by Marítimo. He returned to management after nearly two years, still in Portugal, signing with Segunda Liga side C.F. Os Belenenses. In his first season he won the league, thus returning the club to the top flight after three years.

Van der Gaag took a temporary leave of absence in late September 2013 due to heart problems, after feeling unwell during a league game against former side Marítimo (1–0 home win). In February 2015, he was appointed at Ermis Aradippou FC of the Cypriot First Division, being released after just one month after refusing to renew his contract for the following campaign.

After spending the 2015–16 season back in his country with FC Eindhoven, in the Eerste Divisie, van der Gaag moved to the top flight and successively coached SBV Excelsior and NAC Breda. On 24 May 2019, he returned to the former tier after signing a two-year deal at AFC Ajax's reserves.

Van der Gaag was appointed assistant manager of the first team of on 1 June 2021, replacing the departing Christian Poulsen. His position at the reserves was filled by John Heitinga, who had previously worked in the youth academy.

On 23 May 2022, Van der Gaag was confirmed as assistant head coach of Manchester United, along with Steve McClaren, to work with first team head coach Erik ten Hag, who he previously worked with at Ajax.

Personal life
Van der Gaag's father Wim was also a footballer, who was one of the first professionals in the Netherlands in 1954. His sons Jordan and Luca also went into the game, representing Belenenses SAD.

Honours

Player
PSV
Dutch Supercup: 1992

Manager
Belenenses
Segunda Liga: 2012–13

Ajax
Eredivisie: 2021–22 (assistant manager)

References

External links
Beijen profile 
Stats at Voetbal International 

1971 births
Living people
People from Zutphen
Footballers from Gelderland
Dutch footballers
Association football defenders
Eredivisie players
PSV Eindhoven players
NEC Nijmegen players
Sparta Rotterdam players
FC Utrecht players
Scottish Football League players
Motherwell F.C. players
Primeira Liga players
C.S. Marítimo players
Saudi Professional League players
Al Nassr FC players
Netherlands under-21 international footballers
Dutch expatriate footballers
Expatriate footballers in Scotland
Expatriate footballers in Portugal
Expatriate footballers in Saudi Arabia
Dutch expatriate sportspeople in Scotland
Dutch expatriate sportspeople in Portugal
Dutch expatriate sportspeople in Saudi Arabia
Dutch football managers
Primeira Liga managers
Liga Portugal 2 managers
C.S. Marítimo managers
C.F. Os Belenenses managers
Cypriot First Division managers
Eredivisie managers
FC Eindhoven managers
Excelsior Rotterdam managers
NAC Breda managers
Jong Ajax managers
Manchester United F.C. non-playing staff
Dutch expatriate football managers
Expatriate football managers in Portugal
Expatriate football managers in Cyprus
Dutch expatriate sportspeople in Cyprus
Dutch expatriate sportspeople in England